Shire of Wangaratta may refer to:

 Shire of Wangaratta (Queensland), a former local government area in Queensland, Australia
 Shire of Wangaratta (Victoria), a former local government area in Victoria, Australia